Juha Ikonen (born June 7, 1970) is a Finnish former professional ice hockey player, who last played in 2002.

Ikonen played in the SM-liiga for Espoo Blues and in the Elitserien for Västra Frölunda HC.  He also played for Finland in the 1998 World Ice Hockey Championship.

References

External links

1970 births
Living people
Ice hockey people from Helsinki
Finnish ice hockey right wingers
Espoo Blues players
Frölunda HC players